Momčilo Raspopović (Montenegrin Cyrillic: Момчило Распоповић; born 18 March 1994) is a Montenegrin professional footballer who plays as a right back for Croatian club HNK Gorica and the Montenegro national football team.

Club career

Budućnost
Born in Podgorica, he raised through the ranks of Budućnost where he made his senior debut playing in the Montenegrin First League in the 2012–13 season. At the age of 22, he played both legs in the Europa League second qualifying round matches for Budućnost against Genk. In the first leg played on 14 July 2016, Raspopović was a starter, although Budućnost lost by a score of 2–0 at Genk's Luminus Arena. He also started in the second leg against Genk a week later, which Budućnost won 2–0, although Raspopović missed a crucial penalty in the penalty shootout after overtime. It was arguably Raspopović's first encounter with a team from a significantly stronger league, as Genk at the time fielded the likes of Wilfred Ndidi. Following more than five years with the club, in January 2018, he was loaned to HNK Rijeka in Croatia until the end of the season with a buying option.

Rijeka
Raspopović was loaned to Rijeka in January 2018, after which he made his league debut in a 4–0 victory against NK Istra 1961 on 10 February 2018. After playing a total of eight league games for the rest of the 2017–18 season, Rijeka opted to buy Raspopović's contract from Budućnost, after which he was no a loaned player. On 2 September 2018, Raspopović scored a goal from distance in a 1–1 tie against Dinamo Zagreb.

International career
After having been part of the Montenegrin U17 and Montenegrin U19 team, Raspopović has been a regular presence in the Montenegrin U21 team between 2013 and 2016. On 14 November 2019, he made his debut under coach Faruk Hadžibegić in Montenegro's Euro 2020 qualifier against England, which Montenegro lost 7–0.

Honours

Budućnost
Montenegrin First League (1): 2016–17
Montenegrin Cup (1): 2012–13

Rijeka
 Croatian Cup (2): 2019, 2020

References

External links

 

1994 births
Living people
Footballers from Podgorica
Association football defenders
Montenegrin footballers
Montenegro youth international footballers
Montenegro under-21 international footballers
Montenegro international footballers
FK Budućnost Podgorica players
HNK Rijeka players
FC Astra Giurgiu players
Montenegrin First League players
Croatian Football League players
Montenegrin expatriate footballers
Expatriate footballers in Croatia
Montenegrin expatriate sportspeople in Croatia